Jasvir Kaur Virk is the current president of the Supreme Sikh Society of New Zealand since 2022.

References 

Living people
Year of birth missing (living people)